State Route 746 (SR 746) is a north–south  state highway located in central Ohio, a U.S. state.

Route description
The majority of SR 746's route lies within rural territory, passing amid a vastness of farmland. Beginning at the intersection of US 42 and County Road 155 (CR 155) in Westfield Township, Morrow County, SR 746 runs westerly for a short distance, crossing CR 156 before turning north at the CR 153 intersection. SR 746 passes intersections with CR 25, Helmlich Road, Beatty Road and County Road 148 before entering Marion County, and correspondingly, Richland Township. Next, the state highway meets CR 161, followed by CR 169, where it enters Claridon Township. North of there, SR 746 meets SR 95, then crosses Roberts Road and Marion-Williamsport Road before bending to the northwest as it goes over the Olentangy River. SR 746 turns north again where it intersects CR 163, and comes to an end just after it enters Caledonia at its intersection with SR 309.

History
In 1937, SR 746 was established along its current alignment between US 42 and SR 309. Other than the fact that when first designated, the highway intersecting SR 746 at its northern terminus was US 30S instead of SR 309, there have been no major changes to SR 746.

Major intersections

References

External links

746
Transportation in Marion County, Ohio
Transportation in Morrow County, Ohio